Pavel Aleksandrovich Zolkin (born 1894; died 1962) was an association football player. He was the brother of Leonid Zolkin.

International career
Zolkin played his only game for Russia on May 4, 1913 in a friendly against Sweden.

External links
  Profile

1894 births
1962 deaths
Russian footballers
Russia international footballers
Association football forwards